416th may refer to:

416th Air Expeditionary Operations Group, provisional unit assigned to the United States Air Force Air Mobility Command
416th Bombardment Wing, inactive United States Air Force unit
416th Engineer Command (TEC), US Army Reserve unit that conducts theater-level engineer operations for US Army Central Command
416th Fighter Squadron, inactive United States Air Force unit
416th Flight Test Squadron (416 FLTS*), part of the 412th Test Wing, based at Edwards Air Force Base, California

See also
416 (number)
416 (disambiguation)
416, the year 416 (CDXVI) of the Julian calendar
416 BC